Hicksville is a graphic novel by Dylan Horrocks originally published by Black Eye Comics in 1998. The novel explores the machinations of the comic book industry, and contains a slightly fictionalized account of the history of mainstream American comics, with particular attention paid to the era of Image Comics.

Publication history 
Much of Hicksville was serialized in Horrocks' ten-issue solo series Pickle, published by Black Eye from 1993–1996. The collected edition, which featured much redrawn art, was released by Black Eye in 1998, shortly before the company went out of business. Hicksville was republished by Canadian publisher Drawn & Quarterly in 2001 and again in 2010. In 2010 the graphic novel was republished by New Zealand publisher Victoria University Press.

Hicksville has been translated into Spanish (Astiberri Ediciones), Italian (Black Velvet), German (Reprodukt), French (Casterman and L'Association) and Croatian (Fibra).

Plot
Canadian writer Leonard Batts arrives in the tiny New Zealand town of Hicksville to research the early life of Dick Burger, whose work has taken the comic book industry by storm. He finds that Hicksville is a town in which everyone from the postman to the farmer is an expert on comics, yet everyone seems to hate Burger. Many of the book's main characters are themselves comic creators, and many of their strips are reproduced in full as part of the story, most notably Sam Zabel's extensive account of moving to Los Angeles in order to work with Burger, which he documents in his self-published comic Pickle (the title of the Dylan Horrocks series in which the storyline was actually published).

Themes 
Horrocks said of Hicksville:

Derik Badman writes of the village where much of the book's action takes place:

Characters 
Hicksville is a meta-comic and the book's characters include normal (albeit fictional) humans from our world, and comic book characters (all actually created by Horrocks) who appear in various publications — such as Laffs magazine, Sam Zabel's Pickle, and the various titles published by Eternal Comics — interwoven into the pages of the graphic novel.

Recurring characters 
Leonard Batts — a Canadian comics critic for the fictional Comics World Magazine. He previously published a book on Jack Kirby called The King: Jack Kirby: a Biography and has come to Hicksville in search of information about Dick Burger's origins. He appears at the Hogan's Alley bonfire as Captain Tomorrow, which causes great consternation among the other attendees.

Dick Burger — a cartoonist, originally an orphan from Hicksville who now lives in Los Angeles, who has built a mainstream comics empire, mainly based on his revival of Captain Tomorrow and other characters. He controls Eternal Comics.

Emil Kópen — Kornukopija's greatest living cartoonist, creator of Valja Domena; Kópen "represents the power of cartooning as pure art".

Sam Zabel — an indy cartoonist and creator of the autobiographical comic book series Pickle (as well as a former contributor to New Zealand's Laffs weekly humor magazine). Sam is originally from Hicksville, where he grew up with Dick Burger. He appears at the Hogan's Alley bonfire as Charlie Brown, after previously appearing as Robin.

Sally — Sam's love interest and eventually his wife.

Mopani — the daughter of Irene; they both live in Auckland.

Cincinnati Walker — an American actress who develops an interest in Sam Zabel. She plays Lady Night in the Captain Tomorrow film series.

Mort Molson — creator of the Golden Age Captain Tomorrow.

Lou Goldman — creator of the Golden Age Lady Night.

Hicksville residents 
Grace Pekapeka — former lover of first Dick Burger and later Danton. A botanist, she spent many years working at the Crieste Botanic Institute (Crieste is the capital of Cornucopia). She makes a connection with Kornukopija (Cornucopia) artist Emil Kópen. She appears at the Hogan's Alley bonfire as Milena, the heroine of Kopen's Valja Domena. Her last name is a reference to a native bat of New Zealand.

Helen — appears at the Hogan's Alley bonfire as Batgirl (a costume which originally belonged to Grace). She appears to have a crush on Sam Zabel.

Danton — owner and manager of The Rarebit Fiend tea room. He appears at the Hogan's Alley bonfire as Mister Bunion of Winsor McCay's A Pilgrim's Progress by Mister Bunion.

Huck — frequent customer of The Rarebit Fiend. It's implied that he lives with Harry the postman.

Harry — Hicksville's postman and an avid comics fan, particularly of the work of Ed Pinsent, Chris Reynolds, and the "English School". He appears at the Hogan's Alley bonfire as a character with a square head and a large capital "P" on his shirt.

Famer Dobbs — a farmer with a dog named Fang. He appears at the Hogan's Alley bonfire as Popeye. He is a proponent of the work of Sergio Aragonés.

Mrs. Hicks — proprietor of the Hicksville Book Shop and Lending Library, which stores an amazing collection of rare and unusual comics from all over the world. She appears at the Hogan's Alley bonfire.

Hyram — appears at the Hogan's Alley bonfire as Captain Haddock. He is a proponent of the works of Edgar P. Jacobs.

Kupe — resident and caretaker of Hicksville's lighthouse, as well a secret library of "culturally and spiritually" valuable comics, including Mort Molson's Captain Tomorrow: Rebirth, which was plagiarized by Dick Burger. Kupe ends up with Grace. Kupe is inspired by New Zealand's mythical Kupe.

Dougal

Comic book characters 
Captain Tomorrow — a Golden Age superhero created by Mort Molson, who has been revived as a much darker figure by Dick Burger in the 1990s.

Lady Night — a 1950s-era superhero created by Lou Goldman, who has been revived as a much darker figure by Dick Burger in the 1990s.

The Captain — an explorer based on Captain James Cook.

Hōne Heke — a Maori  man based on the highly influential rangatira (chief) of the Ngāpuhi iwi (tribe) and a war leader in Northern New Zealand; in the book he accompanies the Captain as his "sidekick".

Alfred — a cartographer based on Charles Heaphy. He appears alongside the Captain and Hōne Heke.

Moxie & Toxie — a male & female cartoon duo created by Sam Zabel.

Subsequent work
Leonard Batts and a minor character, cartoonist Emil Kópen, both appear in Horrocks' later series Atlas. Sam Zabel is the protagonist of Horrocks' 2014 graphic novel Sam Zabel and the Magic Pen (Fantagraphics).

Awards 
Hicksville was nominated for Ignatz Awards for Best Graphic Novel & Best Art, and a Harvey Award for Best Reprint Collection. The French edition was nominated for two Prix d’Alph’Arts for Best Graphic Novel & the Prix de la critique ("Critic's Prize"). The foreign editions were nominated for an Attilio Micheluzzi Award for Best Graphic Novel, and the Best Foreign Comic at the Barcelona Comics Festival. It was named one of the top five books of 1998 by The Comics Journal.

In 2002, based on Hicksville and his follow-up series Atlas, Horrocks won an Eisner Award for Talent Deserving of Wider Recognition.

References

External links
 Hicksville website
 Hicksville at Victoria University Press

1998 graphic novels
New Zealand comics titles
20th-century New Zealand novels
Drawn & Quarterly titles
Comics by Dylan Horrocks
Comics about comics